"Can't Stay Away from You" is a 1987 song by Cuban-American singer and songwriter Gloria Estefan, credited to Estefan and her former band, the Miami Sound Machine. The song was released as the third single from their multi-platinum album, Let It Loose (1987). It became Estefan's (and her band's) fifth top 10 hit in the United States, peaking at #6 on the Billboard Hot 100 chart; it was their second #1 hit on the adult contemporary chart, following 1986's "Words Get in the Way". The song originally peaked at #88 on the UK Singles Chart in May 1988, however the song was re-released after the success of its follow-up, "Anything for You", peaking at #7 in March 1989.

The song is a pensive ballad sung from the perspective of a woman who is in love with someone who doesn't feel the same, but she is unwilling to walk away from their relationship because she does not want it to end. The European single contains as a bonus cut a remixed version of "Surrender", an album cut from "Let It Loose", which Estefan performed on "Solid Gold".

Popular Latin singer Jaci Velasquez recorded a Spanish version of the song called "Mi Vida No Es Nada Sin Ti" for her album Milagro.

The song appeared in 1988 episodes of the soap operas Another World and The Young and the Restless.

Critical reception
AllMusic editor Jon O'Brien described the song as "haunting". In an ironic review of 4 February 1989 the Phil Cheeseman, reviewer of British music newspaper Record Mirror, chided the song for lack of class to match the previous own work and described it as a "wearisome ballad". Stuart Maconie of New Musical Express echoed by saying "Have you noticed how the billing of the Sound Machine gets progressively tinier whilst Gloria becomes correspondingly more prominent?" and made a forecast that MSM will "vanish entirely from this earth" soon.

Charts and certifications

Weekly charts

Year-end charts

Certifications

Formats and track listings

Official versions
Original versions
 Album Version — (3:56)

Release history

See also
List of number-one adult contemporary singles of 1988 (U.S.)

References

Further reading 

 Whitburn, Joel (1996). The Billboard Book of Top 40 Hits, 6th Edition (Billboard Publications)

1988 singles
1989 singles
Gloria Estefan songs
Dutch Top 40 number-one singles
Songs written by Gloria Estefan
Song recordings produced by Emilio Estefan
Pop ballads
1987 songs
Epic Records singles